The 1979 Kronenbrau 1308 Classic was a non-ranking invitational snooker tournament, which took place in July 1979.
The tournament was played in Johannesburg, and featured four professional players - Ray Reardon of Wales, Eddie Charlton of Australia and South Africans Perrie Mans and Jimmy van Rensberg.

Charlton won the title, beating Reardon 7–4 in the final.

Main draw

References

Snooker non-ranking competitions
Kronenbrau 1308 Classic
Snooker in South Africa
Kronenbrau 1308 Classic
International sports competitions hosted by South Africa
Sports competitions in Johannesburg
Kronenbrau 1308 Classic